Gracy Singh (born 20 July 1980) is an Indian actress who primarily works in Hindi and Telugu films. She is best known for her role in the films Lagaan and Munna Bhai M.B.B.S. Singh is also a trained Bharatnatyam and Odissi dancer.

Career

Born in Delhi, India, Singh began her career touring with the dance group "The Planets". Her first acting role was in the 1997 television soap, Amanat. In 1999 she was seen in Bengali Film Sundori Bou. She then went on to star opposite Aamir Khan in Ashutosh Gowariker's epic sports-drama Lagaan, where she played a village belle. She was nominated in this role for the Filmfare Award for Best Female Debut, and won the Screen Award for Most Promising Newcomer – Female.

Post Lagaan, Singh appeared in a few successful films in Hindi and Telugu including Munna Bhai M.B.B.S. and Santosham. She has also starred in Punjabi films such as Lakh Pardesi Hoye and a Malayalam film Loudspeaker directed by Jayaraj.

In 2015, Singh returned to television, playing Goddess Santoshi in the series Santoshi Maa on &TV.

Filmography

Television

Awards
 2002: Won - IIFA Award for Star Debut of the Year – Female for Lagaan
 2002: Won - Screen Award for Most Promising Newcomer – Female for Lagaan
 2002: Won - Zee Cine Award for Best Female Debut for Lagaan
 2002: Nominated - Filmfare Award for Best Female Debut for Lagaan
 2002: Nominated - Filmfare Award for Best Supporting Actress – Telugu for Santhosham
 2019: Won - Global Excellence Awards - Award for contribution to Indian cinema

References

External links 

 
 
 
 
Gracy Singh  on MFC 

Living people
1980 births
Actresses from New Delhi
Indian film actresses
Indian television actresses
Indian soap opera actresses
Indian voice actresses
Actresses in Hindi cinema
Actresses in Telugu cinema
Actresses in Punjabi cinema
Actresses in Malayalam cinema
Actresses in Kannada cinema
Actresses in Marathi cinema
Actresses in Bengali cinema
Actresses in Hindi television
Punjabi people
Indian female dancers
Dancers from Delhi
International Indian Film Academy Awards winners
Screen Awards winners
Zee Cine Awards winners
20th-century Indian actresses
21st-century Indian actresses
20th-century Indian dancers
21st-century Indian dancers